Jinnah Medical and Dental College ( or JMDC) was established in 1998 in Karachi, Sindh Pakistan. It is located in the heart of Karachi on Shaheed-e-Millat Road. The first batch of doctors and dentists graduated from JMDC in 2003 and 2004 whereas first batch of pharmacy graduated in 2009. The college is affiliated with the JINNAH SINDH MEDICAL UNIVERSITY (JSMU), which awards MBBS, BDS and pharm-D degrees to its graduates. Graduates from JMDC are eligible to sit for foreign qualifying examinations such as USMLE (ECFMG) and PLAB.

To date, JMDC students have earned over 578 distinctions in MBBS subjects and over 348 distinctions in BDS subjects on the Professional Examinations conducted by the University of Karachi. It is also recognized by the Pakistan Medical and Dental Council.

History
1974	Medicare Hospital
1997	Medicare School of Nursing
1998	College of Medicine
1999	College of Dentistry
2000	Medicare Dental Hospital
2002	Jinnah Medical College Hospital
2009	Jinnah College of Nursing
2015	Medicare Cardiac & General Hospital
2018	Sohail University

S. M. Sohail Trust
S.M. Sohail Trust is named after a legal luminary of Karachi, who was an active participant in the freedom movement as President of Provincial Muslim League and also President of Bihar Relief Fund. After 1947, he became Secretary of the Pakistan Bar Council, founding Managing Director of Karachi Co-operative Housing Union and Chairman Public Accounts Committee of West Pakistan Assembly. He was an ardent advocate of education and founded Sharfabad English School. 
His son, Professor Dr. Syed Tariq Sohail, an eminent Psychiatrist, Educationist and Civil Society Activist, inherited Mr. S. M. Sohail’s passion for education. He established the S.M. Sohail Trust in 1996, which owns Jinnah Medical and Dental College and the attached teaching Hospitals: Jinnah Medical College Hospital, Medicare Dental Hospital and Medicare Heart and General.

Dr. Syed Tariq Sohail, MBBS, DPM, MRC Psych is a psychiatrist. He graduated from Dow Medical College (1965). He proceeded to the UK and worked in several outstanding Psychiatric Institutions. Obtained Diploma in Psychological Medicine from University of London in 1969 and M.R.C. Psych from Royal College Psychiatrists of England in 1972. He returned to Pakistan to serve despite handsome job offers in London and New York. He was appointed to the faculty of Dow Medical College in 1972. In 1975 to found the Medicare Hospital one of the first Private Hospitals in Pakistan.

His social concerns made him take an interest in politics as they related to medical care. As advisor to the Ministry of Health in 1988-1991 he chaired the drafting committee of the National Health Policy and initiated many reforms and represented the Government of Pakistan in negotiations with the World Bank, making a successful case for the support in the social sector at the Pakistan Consortium meeting at Paris in May 1989 & 1990, also led the Pakistan delegation to the World Health Assembly in 1989 & 90 and at the UNICEF Board Meeting in 1990.

He founded Jinnah Medical & Dental College in 1998 and Sohail University in 2018.

Mission statement
The decision taken by the Trust to establish a new medical college was based on its desire to raise the standards of medical education in Pakistan. Conscious that a high level of professional competence has to be attained by medical students, the Trust planned a system of instruction in which the emphasis is on interactive, small group tutorials, problem-based and community-based learning, relevant to our particular culture.

As the world is shrinking rapidly, Jinnah Medical and Dental College students are encouraged to keep abreast of the latest developments in the medical sciences. Other vital aspects of education, too often ignored by medical educationists are emphasized to include communication skills, language skills and courses in humanities. As part of the curriculum, students will also be trained to write and speak effectively, giving them the confidence to pursue graduate studies and participate effectively in seminars and conferences at national and international levels. The College desires its students to develop leadership qualities and a team spirit.
 
The strategy for fulfilling this Mission is based on student-teacher interaction, community-based instruction, and further support in the form of a good library, audio-visual aids, skills laboratory, computer-assisted learning and an active humanities department.

Board of Governors
Chairman
Dr. Syed Tariq Sohail – Managing Trustee, S.M.Sohail Trust, Consultant Psychiatrist, Former Federal Health Adviser
Members	 
Dr. Manzoor Ahmed – Educationalist, Founding Vice Chancellor, Hamdard University
Mrs Bano Roshan Ali Bhimjeee – Business Person
Mr. Syed Adnan Tariq Sohail – Executive Director
Mrs. Ghazala Tariq Sohail – Director Nursing
Mr. Abdus Samad – Financial Controller

Affiliation, Recognition and Listings
The University of Karachi 
Jinnah Sindh Medical University - All Professional Examinations are conducted by the University of Karachi which issues the official mark sheets and final degree for the students.
Pakistan Medical and Dental Council (PMDC) – JMDC and JMCH (Attached Hospital) are recognized for MBBS and BDS studies and house job.
College of Physicians and Surgeons (CPSP) – Recognizes JMCH for Postgraduate Training in Medicine, Surgery, Obstetrics and Gynecology.
World Health Organization (WHO) – Listed in the World Health Organization Directory of Medical Schools.

Graduates are eligible for USMLE, PLAB and other licensing examinations.

Medical Board of California for Postgraduate Training Authorization.
Medical Board of Texas for Postgraduate Training.
Vanderbilt University for undergraduate electives.

Attached Hospitals
Jinnah Medical College Hospital
Medicare Dental Hospital
Medicare Heart & General
LRBT Eye Hospital

External links
 Official website

Universities and colleges in Karachi
Dental schools in Pakistan
Medical colleges in Sindh
Memorials to Muhammad Ali Jinnah